King of Italy was the title given to the ruler of the Kingdom of Italy after the fall of the Western Roman Empire. The first to take the title was Odoacer, a barbarian military leader, in the late 5th century, followed by the Ostrogothic kings up to the mid-6th century. With the Frankish conquest of Italy in the 8th century, the Carolingians assumed the title, which was maintained by subsequent Holy Roman Emperors throughout the Middle Ages. The last Emperor to claim the title was Charles V in the 16th century. During this period, the holders of the title were crowned with the Iron Crown of Lombardy.

A Kingdom of Italy was restored from 1805 to 1814 with Napoleon as its only king, centered in Northern Italy. It was not until the Italian unification in the 1860s that an independent Kingdom of Italy covering the entire Italian Peninsula was restored. From 1861 the House of Savoy held the title of King of Italy until the last king, Umberto II, was exiled in 1946 when Italy became a republic.

History
After the deposition of the last Western Emperor in 476, Heruli leader Odoacer was appointed Dux Italiae ("Duke of Italy") by the reigning Byzantine Emperor Zeno. Later, the Germanic foederati, the Scirians and the Heruli, as well as a large segment of the Italic Roman army, proclaimed Odoacer  ('King of Italy). In 493, the Ostrogothic king Theoderic the Great killed Odoacer, and set up a new dynasty of kings of Italy. Ostrogothic rule ended when Italy was reconquered by the Byzantine Empire in 552.

In 568, the Lombards entered the peninsula and ventured to recreate a barbarian kingdom in opposition to the Empire, establishing their authority over much of Italy, except the Exarchate of Ravenna and the duchies of Rome, Venetia, Naples and the southernmost portions. In the 8th century, estrangement between the Italians and the Byzantines allowed the Lombards to capture the remaining Roman enclaves in northern Italy. However, in 774, they were defeated by the Franks under Charlemagne, who deposed their king and took up the title "king of the Lombards". After the death of Charles the Fat in 887, Italy fell into instability and a number of kings attempted to establish themselves as independent Italian monarchs. During this period, known as the Feudal Anarchy (888–962), the title Rex Italicorum ("King of the Italians" or "King of the Italics") was introduced. After the breakup of the Frankish empire, Otto I added Italy to the Holy Roman Empire and continued the use of the title Rex Italicorum. The last to use this title was Henry II (1004–1024). Subsequent emperors used the title "King of Italy" until Charles V. They were crowned in Pavia, Milan and Bologna.

In 1805, Napoleon I was crowned with the Iron Crown of Lombardy at the Milan Cathedral. The next year, Holy Roman Emperor Francis II abdicated his imperial title. From the deposition of Napoleon I (1814) until the Italian Unification (1861), there was no Italian monarch claiming the overarching title. The Risorgimento successfully established the House of Savoy dynasty over the whole peninsula and, uniting the kingdoms of Sardinia and the Two Sicilies, it formed the modern Kingdom of Italy. The monarchy was superseded by the Italian Republic, after a constitutional referendum was held on 2 June 1946, after World War II. The Italian monarchy formally ended on 12 June of that year and Umberto II left the country.

As "Kingdom of Odoacer"

Initially named Dux Italiae (Duke of Italy) by Zeno, the Roman Emperor in Constantinople, he later was recognized as King of Italy by the Foederati in control of the Italian peninsula.  He was deposed by the Ostrogoths, who established their own kingdom.

 Odoacer (476–493)

Ostrogothic Kingdom (493–553)

Theodoric the Great was invited by the emperor Zeno to take Italy from Odoacer and rule it in Zeno's name.  He defeated Odoacer in 493, establishing a new kingdom in place of Odoacer's. Officially, the Ostrogothic kings ruled the Roman citizens in Italy as a viceroy of the Roman emperors, and their own Gothic people as their king, though functionally they ran their kingdom entirely independently from the Roman authority in Constantinople.  Their greatest extent was during Theodoric's reign; as Roman Emperors from the east began to exert more power and retake control of Roman territory, the last Ostrogothic king fell to the Emperor Justinian in 553.  

 Theodoric the Great (493–526)
 Athalaric (526–534)
 Theodahad (534–536)
 Witiges (536–540)
 Ildibad (540–541)
 Eraric (541)
 Totila (541–552)
 Teia (552–553)

Interregnum 553 – 568

Roman authority in Italy was briefly re-established under Justinian, though his gains were lost under his successor Justin II, after a new Germanic tribe, the Lombards, invaded from the north and established their kingdom in 568.

Justinian I (553–565) (as Roman Emperor) 
Justin II (565–568) (as Roman Emperor)

Kingdom of the Lombards (568–814)

The Lombards under Alboin established their kingdom in the extreme north of Italy in 568, gradually pushing the Byzantine Romans back from the peninsula until only the Exarchate of Ravenna remained under Roman control.  This finally fell in the 750s, with the Lombards gaining control of the whole of the peninsula.  The last Lombard King of Italy, Desiderius, was deposed by his son-in-law Charlemagne, who folded it into the larger Carolingian Empire, which evolved over time into the Holy Roman Empire.

 Alboin (568–572)
 Cleph (572–574)
 Rule of the dukes (ten-year interregnum)
 Authari (584–590)
 Agilulf (591 – c. 616)
 Adaloald (c. 616 – c. 626)
 Arioald (c. 626 – 636)
 Rothari (636–652)
 Rodoald (652–653)
 Aripert I (653–661)
 Perctarit and Godepert (661–662)
 Grimoald (662–671)
 Garibald (671)
 Perctarit (671–688), restored from exile
 Alahis (688–689), rebel
 Cunincpert (688–700)
 Liutpert (700–701)
 Raginpert (701)
 Aripert II (701–712)
 Ansprand (712)
 Liutprand (712–744)
 Hildeprand (744)
 Ratchis (744–749)
 Aistulf (749–756)
 Desiderius (756–774)

Kingdom of Italy (781–962)

Carolingian Dynasty (774–887)

Charlemagne ruled over Italy as King of the Lombards. In 781, he named his son Pepin as King of Italy, though he still maintained suzerainty over the land. Charlemagne was crowned Roman Emperor in 800, while the Kingdom of Italy became one of the constituent kingdoms of the Empire. Beginning with Louis the Pious in 818, the Kingdom was ruled directly by the Carolingian Emperor himself.

 Charlemagne as King of the Lombards (774–814) and Roman Emperor (800–814) 
 Pepin (781–810)
 Bernard (810–818)
 Louis I (818–822)
 Lothair I (822–855)
 Louis II (844–875)
 Charles II the Bald (875–877)
 Carloman (877–879)
 Charles III the Fat (879–887)

Instability (888–962)

After 887, Italy fell into instability, with many rulers claiming the kingship simultaneously:

 Berengar I (887–896), vassal of the German King Arnulf of Carinthia, reduced to Friuli (889–894), deposed by Arnulf in 896.
 Guy of Spoleto (889–894), opponent of Berengar, ruled most of Italy but was deposed by Arnulf.
 Lambert of Spoleto (891–896), subking of his father Guy before 894, reduced to Spoleto (894–895).
 Arnulf of Carinthia (894–899)
 Ratold, sub-king (896)

In 896, Arnulf and Ratold lost control of Italy, which was divided between Berengar and Lambert:
 Berengar I (896–924), seized Lambert's portion upon the latter's death in 898.
 Lambert of Spoleto (896–898)
 Louis III of Provence (900–905), opposed Berengar in 900–902 and 905.
 Rudolph II of Burgundy (922–933), defeated Berengar but fled Italy in 926.
 Hugh of Arles (926–947), elected by Berengar's partisans in 925, resigned to Provence after 945.
 Lothair II of Arles (945–950)
 Berengar II of Ivrea, jointly with his son Adalbert of Ivrea (950–961)

In 951 Otto I invaded Italy and was crowned with the Iron Crown of Lombardy. In 952, Berengar and Adalbert became his vassals but remained kings until being deposed by Otto.

Holy Roman Empire (962–1556)

Otto is considered to be the founding emperor of the Holy Roman Empire, and the Kingdom of Italy was considered one of the constituent realms of the Empire.  Beginning in the 12th century, states such as the Republic of Venice and the Papal States captured more and more territory from the Kingdom of Italy, and the Empire's territory on the Peninsula shrunk over time.  After Charles V, the emperors stopped being crowned with the Iron Crown of Lombardy and the Italian title fell into disuse. Imperial control in Italy receded to Trent and South Tyrol until the dissolution of the Empire in 1806.  Southern Italy had never been in control of the Holy Roman Empire; it remained initially under the control of various Byzantine fiefs until the Norman Kingdom of Sicily (later the Kingdom of Naples) took control of the area in the 13th century.  Central Italy, along the Rome-Ravenna axis, was part of the Papal States, under the direct personal rule of the pope.

Ottonian dynasty (962–1024)

Salian dynasty (1027–1125)

Süpplingenburg dynasty (1125–1137)

House of Hohenstaufen (1128–1197)

House of Welf (1208–1212)

House of Hohenstaufen (1212–1254)

House of Luxembourg (1311–1313)

House of Wittelsbach (1327–1347)

House of Luxembourg (1355–1437)

House of Habsburg (1437–1556)

Charles V was the last emperor to be crowned king of Italy or to officially use the title. The Habsburg emperors claimed the Italian crown until 1801. The empire continued to include Italian territories until its dissolution in 1806.

Kingdom of Italy as a client state of France, House of Bonaparte (1805–1814)
In 1805, Napoleon established a client state in northern Italy, named the Kingdom of Italy. He established himself as King of Italy, in personal union with his role as Emperor of the French. This client state did not survive the end of the Napoleonic era; in its place, the Congress of Vienna established a number of independent duchies and kingdoms in the region.

Full title
This title is present on Italian laws proclaimed by Napoleon I:

[Name], by the Grace of God and the Constitutions, Emperor of the French and King of Italy.

Independent Kingdom of Italy, House of Savoy (1861–1946)

During and after the Revolutions of 1848, sentiment on the peninsula grew for the establishment of a unified Italian kingdom. Southern Italy had not been united with Northern Italy since the early medieval period, being mostly under the rule of the Kingdom of Naples and the Kingdom of the Two Sicilies. Northern Italy, in the early 19th century, came under the domination of the Kingdom of Sardinia, which besides its namesake island, also ruled the expansive Piedmont and Savoy regions along the French-Italian borderlands. The formerly Republican leader in southern Italy, Giuseppe Garibaldi, made common cause with the House of Savoy to overthrow the Kingdom of the Two Sicilies, and the people voted in a plebiscite to join Sardinia to form the Kingdom of Italy in 1861; the Papal States and the city of Rome were annexed to the Kingdom in 1870, completing the Unification of Italy. This kingdom lasted until the aftermath of World War II, when the 1946 Italian institutional referendum ended the monarchy.

Full title

Up until the dissolution of the monarchy in 1946, the full titles of the Kings of the Kingdom of Italy (1861–1946) were:

[Name], by the Grace of God and the will of the Nation, King of Italy, King of Sardinia, Cyprus, Jerusalem, Armenia, Duke of Savoy, count of Maurienne, Marquis (of the Holy Roman Empire) in Italy; Prince of Piedmont, Carignano, Oneglia, Poirino, Trino; Prince and Perpetual Vicar of the Holy Roman Empire; Prince of Carmagnola, Montmélian with Arbin and Francin, Prince bailiff of the Duchy of Aosta, Prince of Chieri, Dronero, Crescentino, Riva di Chieri and Banna, Busca, Bene, Bra, Duke of Genoa, Monferrat, Aosta, Duke of Chablais, Genevois, Duke of Piacenza, Marquis of Saluzzo (Saluces), Ivrea, Susa, of Maro, Oristano, Cesana, Savona, Tarantasia, Borgomanero and Cureggio, Caselle, Rivoli, Pianezza, Govone, Salussola, Racconigi over Tegerone, Migliabruna and Motturone, Cavallermaggiore, Marene, Modane and Lanslebourg, Livorno Ferraris, Santhià, Agliè, Centallo and Demonte, Desana, Ghemme, Vigone, Count of Barge, Villafranca, Ginevra, Nizza, Tenda, Romont, Asti, Alessandria, of Goceano, Novara, Tortona, Bobbio, Soissons, Sant'Antioco, Pollenzo, Roccabruna, Tricerro, Bairo, Ozegna, delle Apertole, Baron of Vaud and of Faucigni, Lord of Vercelli, Pinerolo, of Lomellina, of Valle Sesia, of the Marquisate of Ceva, Overlord of Monaco, Roccabruna and eleven-twelfths of Menton, Noble Patrician of Venice, Patrician of Ferrara.

See also

 King of Jerusalem
 List of kings of the Lombards
 List of monarchs of Naples
 List of monarchs of Sardinia
 List of Sicilian monarchs
 List of monarchs of the Armenian Kingdom of Cilicia
 List of monarchs of the Kingdom of the Two Sicilies
 List of rulers of Tuscany
 List of popes
 List of viceroys of Naples
 List of viceroys of Sicily
 List of Italian queens

Notes

Political history of Italy
Italy
Italy
 
Monarchy in Italy